John "Jack" Fish was a professional football coach for the Newark Tornadoes of the National Football League in 1930. In 1930, the Tornadoes moved to Newark from Orange, New Jersey. The team then hired Fish and Andy Salata to serve  as co-coaches. Neither man had ever coached in the NFL before. Under the two coaches the Tornadoes were 1-11, to finish last in the league.

References

Year of birth missing
Year of death missing
Orange Tornadoes coaches
Seton Hall Pirates baseball coaches